
AD 5 was a common year starting on Thursday of the Julian calendar. In the Roman Empire, it was known as the Year of the Consulship of Messalla and Cinna (or, less frequently, year 758 Ab urbe condita). The denomination "AD 5" for this year has been used since the early medieval period, when the Anno Domini calendar era became the prevalent method in Europe for naming years.

Events

By place

Roman Empire 
 Rome acknowledges Cunobelinus, king of the Catuvellauni, as king of Britain.
 The Germanic tribes of Cimbri and Charydes send ambassadors to Rome.
 Tiberius conquers Germania Inferior.
 Agrippina the Elder marries Germanicus, her second cousin.

Births 
 Habib the Carpenter, Syrian disciple, martyr
 Paul the Apostle, Jewish leader of the Christians
 Ruzi Ying, great-grandson of Xuan of Han (d. AD 25)
 Yin Lihua, empress of the Han Dynasty (d. AD 64)

Deaths

See also 
Ab urbe condita

References

Sources 

 

 

als:0er#Johr 5